Silver Ginger 5 was originally formed in 1999 as a solo project for Ginger, lead singer-songwriter of The Wildhearts.

The band was not formed until after the recording of the album Black Leather Mojo, and despite the name only ever had 4 members. The name itself, according to Ginger, came from his trying to reassure himself in an uncertain time of his life; as he considered silver his lucky colour, and five his lucky number, he figured surrounding himself with luck would be a good move.

Albums 
 Black Leather Mojo (2000)

Ginger has repeatedly stated that the band wrote a second Silver Ginger 5 album, but have not yet managed to find the time in their individual schedules to record it.

The Great White Monkey – live album

Tours 

The band has played numerous live shows, with a revolving line-up, which has included the following members:

Ginger – vocals, guitar
"Random" Jon Poole – bass
Conny Bloom – lead guitar, vocals
Tomas Broman – drums
Ritch Battersby – drums
Andy Selway – drums on the studio album

Notes and references

External links 
 SilverGinger5 biography at FiveMilesHigh

British rock music groups